Bar billiards is a form of billiards which involves scoring points by potting balls in holes on the playing surface of the table rather than in pockets. Bar billiards developed from the French/Belgian game billard russe, of Russian origin. The current form started in the UK in the 1930s and now has leagues in Sussex, Berkshire, Oxfordshire, Buckinghamshire, Surrey, Kent, Cambridgeshire, Hampshire, Suffolk, Yorkshire and Northamptonshire. These counties comprise the All England Bar Billiards Association. There are also leagues in Guernsey and Jersey where the annual world championships take place.

History

The game of bar billiards developed originally from the French  billiard, which due to the expensive tables in the fifteenth century was played only by the French monarchy and the very rich. The game was transformed into Billiard Russe during the 16th century for the Russian Tsars and a derivative of Bagatelle played by French royalty.

Bar billiards was first imported into the UK during the early 1930s when David Gill, an Englishman witnessed a game of billiard russe (Russian billiards) taking place in Belgium. He persuaded the Jelkes company of Holloway Road in London to make a similar table. Tables were also made by Sams, Riley, Burroughs & Watts and Clare. It is now a traditional bar game played in leagues in the English counties of Berkshire, Buckinghamshire, Cambridgeshire, Hampshire, Kent, Norfolk, Northamptonshire, Oxfordshire, Suffolk, Surrey, Sussex and Yorkshire, and also the Channel Islands. The game's governing body is the All England Bar Billiards Association. There are also leagues in Guernsey and Jersey. The standard "league" tables have a playing surface approximately 32 inches (81 cm) wide. Sams also made a narrower version with a 28-inch (71 cm) width playing surface.

Gameplay
Bar billiards is played on a unique table with no side or corner pockets but with nine holes in the playing surface which are assigned various point values ranging from 10 to 200. There are eight balls in all, seven white and one red. Potting the red ball in any hole scores double points. On the playfield are normally placed three pegs or mushrooms. There are two white pegs one either side of the 100 hole with one black peg in front of the 200 hole. Earliest versions of the game used wooden mushrooms instead of pegs which have a thin curved stalk and a flattish rounded cap. These were normally placed in front of the 50 and 200 holes often with a fourth mushroom in front of the 100 hole. This version was often referred to as Russian billiards, probably named after the very similar French and Belgian game billiard russe which has a longer history, neither are to be confused with the common billiards game in Russia. There are a couple of leagues that still play this version in East Anglia in the Norwich and Sudbury areas.
If a white peg is knocked over then the player's break is ended and all score acquired during that break is discarded. Knocking down the black peg ends the player's break and all points are lost. In the case that a white and a black peg are both knocked over, then the first peg to be knocked over is counted. All shots are played from the front end of the table so access to all sides is not required which is ideal in a smallish bar or pub. At the start of the game or when there are no balls remaining on the table a white ball is placed on the spot on the 'D' and the red ball is placed on the spot in front of that. This 'Break shot' may be done a maximum of three times if both balls are potted before one ball must remain on the table known as the '1-up', failing to leave this one ball up results in a foul and loss of break. The next shot attempted is the 'split shot' where the object ball is usually potted in the 50 hole and the cue ball is potted in the 100 hole. There are variants to this; sometimes it is necessary to pot the balls into the 50 and 10 holes for example. If successful the break shot can be used again and so on. Players take alternate turns or 'breaks' at the table playing from where their opponent has left off. If the player fails to pot a ball then the break has ended and the second player takes his break by placing another ball on the first spot. If all balls are in play, then the nearest ball to the 'D' is removed and put on the spot. If a player fails to hit a ball, then the break ends and all points earned in that break are lost.
The play is time-limited. A coin will usually give around 17 minutes of play dependent on region. After this time a bar drops inside the table stopping any potted balls from returning, leading to a steady decrease in the number of balls in play.
The last ball can only be potted into either the 100 or 200 hole having been played off either side cushion.

The Bar Billiards world championship takes place each November on the island of Jersey.

World Championship results history 
The Bar Billiards World Championship (called the British Isles Open up to 1999) is held every year in Jersey.

Multi-time world champions
Kevin Tunstall 7
Jim Millward 4
Trevor Gallienne 3
Mark Trafford 3
Peter Noel 2
Steve Ahier 2
Bernie McCluskey 2
Terry Race 2
Paul Sainsbury 2

References

External links
British Bar Billiards
Bar Billiards entry at Online Guide to Traditional Games – also has information about the French and Italian versions

English inventions
Obstacle billiards
Pub games
Tabletop cue games